Special Agent is a 1949 American film noir crime film directed by William C. Thomas and starring William Eythe. The storyline is loosely based on the DeAutremont Brothers' 1923 train robbery.

Plot
With their farm in financial jeopardy, the Devereaux brothers, Ed and Paul, decide to rob a train. After their getaway, railroad detective Johnny Douglas arrives to investigate, with help from Lucille Peters, whose father was killed during the robbery.

Cast
 William Eythe as Johnny Douglas
 Kasey Rogers as Lucille Peters
 Paul Valentine as Edmond Devereaux
 George Reeves as Paul Devereaux
 Carole Mathews as Rose McCreary
 Tom Powers as Chief Special Agent Wilcox
 Raymond Bond as Sheriff Babcock
 Frank Puglia as Grandfather Devereaux
 Walter Baldwin as Pop Peters
 Jeff York as Jake Rumpler
 Virginia Christine as Mabel Rumpler
 Robert Williams as Supt. Olmstead
 Joseph Granby as Sheriff Dodson
 Morgan Farley as Dr. Bowen
 John Hilton as Frank Kent
 Peter Miles as Jake Rumpler Jr
 Jimmy Hunt as Tim Rumpler
 Arthur Stone as Tad Miller
 Truman Bradley as Narrator

External links 

1949 films
1949 crime drama films
American black-and-white films
American crime drama films
Films directed by William C. Thomas
Paramount Pictures films
Crime films based on actual events
Drama films based on actual events
1940s English-language films
1940s American films